The 37th annual Venice International Film Festival was held on 28 August to 8 September, 1980.

Jury
The following people comprised the 1980 jury:
 Suso Cecchi d'Amico (Italy) (head of jury)
 Yûssif Châhine (Egypt)  
 Michel Ciment (France)  
 Umberto Eco (Italy) 
 Gillo Pontecorvo (Italy) 
 Andrew Sarris (USA)    
 George Stevens, Jr. (USA) 
 Margarethe von Trotta (West Germany)

Films in competition

Officina veneziana

Les enfants du vent by Brahim Tsaki 
Ajándék ez a nap by  Péter Gothár
Opera prima by Fernando Trueba
Oxalá by  António-Pedro Vasconcelos
Lásky mezi kapkami deste by  Karel Kachyna
Petrijin venac by  Srdjan Karanovic
Uomini e no by  Valentino Orsini
L'altra donna by  Peter Del Monte
La ragazza di via Mille lire by  Gianni Serra
Masoch by  Franco Brogi Taviani
Les nouveaux romantiques by  Mohamed Benayat
C'est la vie by  Paul Vecchiali
Guns by  Robert Kramer
Der Aufstand by  Peter Lilienthal
 by  Christian Rischert
La repetition generale by  Werner Schroeter
Charlotte by  Frans Weisz
Pilgrim, Farewell by  Michael Roemer

Films out of competition
 The Empire Strikes Back  by  Irvin Kershner
 The Black Stallion  by  Carroll Ballard
 Lightning Over Water  by  Wim Wenders
 Loulou  by  Maurice Pialat
 Mon oncle d'Amérique by Alain Resnais
 Premier pas by Mohamed Bouamari

Awards
Golden Lion:
Atlantic City - ex-aequo 
Gloria - ex-aequo

References 

Edoardo Pittalis - Roberto Pugliese, Bella di Notte, August 1996
L'Europeo, Cinema in Laguna, SePtember 2008

External links 

Venice Film Festival 1980 Awards on IMDb

Venice
Venice
Venice 
Venice Film Festival
Film
Venice International Film Festival
Venice International Film Festival